Novo Horizonte (Portuguese for "new horizon") may refer to the following places in Brazil:

Novo Horizonte, Bahia, a municipality of Bahia state
Novo Horizonte, Santa Catarina, a municipality of Santa Catarina state
Novo Horizonte, São Paulo, a municipality of São Paulo state
Novo Horizonte, Ataléia, a district of Ataléia, Minas Gerais state